The 1964 Ohio State Buckeyes football team represented the Ohio State University in the 1964 Big Ten Conference football season. The Buckeyes compiled a 7–2 record.

Schedule

Coaching staff
 Woody Hayes – Head Coach – 14th year

Season summary

SMU

Indiana

Illinois

USC

Wisconsin

Iowa

Penn State

Northwestern

Michigan

1965 pro draftees

References

Ohio State
Ohio State Buckeyes football seasons
Ohio State Buckeyes football